(), is a Finnish folk song composed by  in 1902. Karelian Finn  also published an early Karelianist adaptation of Juva's original Finnish lyrics in the Livvi-Karelian language of East Karelia. The music of the Anthem of the Republic of Karelia was derived from this song.

Lyrics

References

Finnish music